American Teenage Rock 'n' Roll Machine is the second studio album by American rock band The Donnas, released in 1998 on Lookout!.

As of 2005 it has sold 32,000 units in United States according to Nielsen SoundScan.

Track listing 
all songs by The Donnas
"Rock 'n' Roll Machine" – 2:53
"You Make Me Hot" – 2:20
"Checkin' It Out" – 3:13
"Gimmie My Radio" – 2:09
"Outta My Mind" – 2:15
"Looking for Blood" – 1:54
"Leather on Leather" – 2:17
"Wanna Get Some Stuff" – 2:18
"Speed Demon" – 2:01
"Shake in the Action" – 3:03

Personnel 
 Donna A. – vocals
 Donna R. – guitar, vocals
 Donna F. – bass guitar
 Donna C. – drums, percussion, vocals

Production 
Producer: The Donnas, Romeo Voltage
Layout Design: C. Sterling Imlay

References 

The Donnas albums
1998 albums
Lookout! Records albums